The 2012 Women's National Invitation Tournament (WNIT) was a single-elimination tournament of 64 National Collegiate Athletic Association (NCAA) Division I teams that did not participate in the 2012 NCAA Division I women's basketball tournament. The tournament were played entirely on campus sites. The highest ranked team in each conference that did not receive a bid to the NCAA Tournament received an automatic bid to this tournament. The remaining slots were filled by the WNIT Selection Committee. The Oklahoma State Cowgirls won their first WNIT title, defeating the James Madison Dukes in the championship game, 75–68. Toni Young of Oklahoma State was named tournament MVP.

Preseason WNIT 
The pre-season 2011 is the 18th edition of the Women's National Invitation Tournament (WNIT), an annual event hosted entirely at campus sites. The championship game had the No. 1-ranked Baylor hosting the No. 2-ranked Notre Dame. The WNIT MVP Brittney Griner scored 32 points for Baylor in a win over Notre Dame.

Championship Bracket 
Source:

Consolation Brackets 
Source:

Consolation Rounds 1 & 2 
 Games Played at Akron

Consolation Rounds 1 & 2 
 Games Played at McNeese State

Consolation Round 3 
 Quarterfinal Losers

Team listed on top is home team

Post-Season Tournament 
The post-season 2012 Women's National Invitation Tournament (WNIT) is a single-elimination tournament of 64 National Collegiate Athletic Association (NCAA) Division I teams that did not participate in the 2012 NCAA Division I women's basketball tournament. The tournament is played entirely on campus sites. The highest ranked team in each conference that did not receive a bid to the NCAA Tournament received an automatic bid to this tournament. The remaining slots were filled by the WNIT Selection Committee.

The Oklahoma State Cowgirls won their first WNIT title by the score of 75–68 over the James Madison Dukes. Oklahoma State was coached by Jim Littell, who took over following the death of head coach Kurt Budke in a plane crash on November 17, 2011.

Participants

Automatic bids

In addition to the 31 automatic bids from respective conferences, 33 teams, with a winning record, will receive an at-large bid to the tournament.

At-Large bids

Bracket
Source: 

Team listed on top is home team

Region 1

Region 2

Region 3

Region 4

Semifinals and championship game
Played at host schools

All-tournament team
 Toni Young, Oklahoma State (MVP)
 Liz Donohoe, Oklahoma State
 Kirby Burkholder, James Madison
 Tarik Hislop, James Madison
 Kayla Alexander, Syracuse
 Dominique Conners, San Diego
Source:

See also
 2012 NCAA Division I men's basketball tournament
 2012 NCAA Division I women's basketball tournament
 2012 Women's Basketball Invitational

References 

Women's National Invitation Tournament
Women's National Invitation Tournament
Women's National Invitation Tournament
Women's National Invitation Tournament